is a former Japanese football player.

Playing career
Nonoshita was born in Ehime Prefecture on May 24, 1970. After graduating from Osaka University of Commerce, he joined Gamba Osaka in 1993. Although he played as center back from first season, he could not play many matches. In 1996, he moved to Yokohama Flügels. He played many matches as left back of three back defense from 1997. In October 1998, he moved to Consadole Sapporo. However the club was relegated to J2 League end of 1998 season. He could not play at all in the match in 1999 and he retired end of 1999 season.

Club statistics

References

External links

f-sports.com

1970 births
Living people
Osaka University of Commerce alumni
Association football people from Ehime Prefecture
Japanese footballers
J1 League players
J2 League players
Gamba Osaka players
Yokohama Flügels players
Hokkaido Consadole Sapporo players
Association football defenders